Xín Chải is a rural commune of Vị Xuyên District in Hà Giang Province, Vietnam.

References

Populated places in Hà Giang province